Gubei (Shanghainese: ku2poh4; Mandarin pinyin: Gǔběi) is an affluent residential area located in Changning District, Shanghai and covers an area of . Gubei is best known as an enclave of East Asian expatriates in Shanghai, including those from Japan, South Korea, Hong Kong, Macau and Taiwan. As a result, Gubei is sometimes informally referred to as "Little Tokyo", "Little Taipei" or "K-town". Gubei has a Koreatown neighborhood. Gubei also has a significant number of expatriates from Europe and North America. Administratively, it comprises two residential communities (居委会), Gubei Xincheng (古北新城) and Gubei Hongyuan (古北虹苑).

Transportation
Shanghai Metro
Line 10 (Shanghai Metro), Yili Road station
Line 10 (Shanghai Metro), Shuicheng Road station
Line 15 (Shanghai Metro), Yaohong Road station
Buses 
No.57 
No.48
No.911

Attractions
Hongqiao State Guesthouse 
Shanghai East Radio Station 
Soong Ching-ling Mausoleum 
Takashimaya (opened in December 2012)

Schools
Yew Chung International School of Shanghai 
Jianqing Experimental School 
Shanghai United International School
Concord Bilingual High School
Hong Qiao International School - Rainbow Bridge International School

See also
 Japanese community of Shanghai

References

Neighbourhoods of Shanghai